Pseudodaphnella rubroguttata is a species of sea snail, a marine gastropod mollusk in the family Raphitomidae.

Description

Distribution
This marine species occurs off New Hebrides and Papua New Guinea.

References

 Adams H. (1872). Descriptions of fourteen new species of land and marine shells. Proceedings of the Zoological Society of London. (1872): 12-15, pl. 3.

External links
 
 Kilburn, R. N. (2009). Genus Kermia (Mollusca: Gastropoda: Conoidea: Conidae: Raphitominae) in South African Waters, with Observations on the Identities of Related Extralimital Species. African Invertebrates. 50(2): 217-236
 Fedosov A. E. & Puillandre N. (2012) Phylogeny and taxonomy of the Kermia–Pseudodaphnella (Mollusca: Gastropoda: Raphitomidae) genus complex: a remarkable radiation via diversification of larval development. Systematics and Biodiversity 10(4): 447-477
 Li B.-Q. [Baoquan] & Li X.-Z. [Xinzheng] (2014) Report on the Raphitomidae Bellardi, 1875 (Mollusca: Gastropoda: Conoidea) from the China Seas. Journal of Natural History 48(17-18): 999-1025
 Gastropods.com: Pseudodaphnella rubroguttata

rubroguttata
Gastropods described in 1872